Kateryna Kozlova was the defending champion, but was facing a six month doping ban for taking a drug containing the banned substance 1,3-Dimethylbutylamine.

Carina Witthöft won the title, defeating Johanna Larsson in the final, 6–3, 6–3.

Seeds

Main draw

Finals

Top half

Bottom half

References 
 Main draw

Reinert Open - Singles
Reinert Open